Sungai Choh is a small town situated within the boundary of both Gombak District and Hulu Selangor District, Selangor.

Sungai Choh  has existed since the late 19th century. Early settlers from Sumatera (more specifically, the Malay community from the descendants of Bengkulu, a province in Indonesia) are the first to settle down at Sungai Choh. Today, most of the community at Sungai Choh are Bengkulu-related.

No one really knows how Sungai Choh got its name. According to some, the name comes from a river at Sungai Choh, called Sungai "Chul". Due to time, Sungai "Chul" has been called Sungai Choh instead in line with the current dialect of the community. Sungai Choh is also called as Sungai Choh Simpang (Literally meaning, "Sungai Choh Junction") in old maps. This is likely because of the three-way junction that leads to either the main road (to Ipoh or Kuala Lumpur), or to Sungai Buaya, a neighboring town.

Sungai Choh is known of their traditional Bengkulu tarts. The community at Sungai Choh still practices the Bengkulunese customs and culture, as seen in weddings or celebrations.

Education
There is one secondary school and 3 primary schools:
 Sekolah Menengah Kebangsaan Sungai Choh Rawang
 Sekolah Rendah Kebangsaan Sungai Choh
 Sekolah Rendah Agama Sungai Choh
 Sekolah Jenis Kebangsaan Tamil Ladang Sungai Choh

References

Gombak District
Towns in Selangor